A scholarship is a form of financial aid awarded to students for further education. Generally, scholarships are awarded based on a set of criteria such as academic merit, diversity and inclusion, athletic skill, and financial need. 

Scholarship criteria usually reflect the values and goals of the donor of the award, and while scholarship recipients are not required to repay scholarships, the awards may require that the recipient continue to meet certain requirements during their period of support, such maintaining a minimum grade point average or engaging in a certain activity (e.g., playing on a school sports team for athletic scholarship holders). 

Scholarships also range in generosity; some range from covering partial tuition ranging all the way to a 'full-ride', covering all tuition, accommodation, housing and others.

Some prestigious, highly competitive scholarships are well-known even outside the academic community, such as Fulbright Scholarship and the Rhodes Scholarships at the graduate level, and the Robertson, Morehead-Cain and Jefferson Scholarships at the undergraduate level.

Scholarships vs. grants

While the terms scholarship and grant are frequently used interchangeably, they are distinctly different. Where grants are offered based exclusively on financial need, scholarships may have a financial need component but rely on other criteria as well.

 Academic scholarships typically use a minimum grade-point average or standardized test score such as the ACT or SAT to narrow down awardees.
 Athletic scholarships are generally based on athletic performance of a student and used as a tool to recruit high-performing athletes for their school's athletic teams.
 Merit scholarships can be based on a number of criteria, including performance in a particular school subject or club participation or community service.

A federal Pell Grant can be awarded to someone planning to receive their undergraduate degree and is solely based on their financial needs.

Types

The most common scholarships may be classified as:
 Merit-based: These awards are based on a student's academic, artistic, athletic, or other abilities, and often a factor in an applicant's extracurricular activities and community service record. Most such merit-based scholarships are paid directly by the institution the student attends, rather than issued directly to the student.
 Need-based: Some private need-based awards are confusingly called scholarships, and require the results of a FAFSA (the family's expected family contribution). However, scholarships are often merit-based, while grants tend to be need-based.
 Student-specific: These are scholarships for which applicants must initially qualify based upon gender, race, religion, family, and medical history, or many other student-specific factors. Minority scholarships are the most common awards in this category. For example, students in Canada may qualify for a number of Indigenous scholarships, whether they study at home or abroad. The Gates Millennium Scholars Program is another minority scholarship funded by Bill and Melinda Gates for excellent African American, American Indian, Asian Pacific Islander American, and Latino students who enroll in college. 
 Career-specific: These are scholarships a college or university awards to students who plan to pursue a specific field of study. Often, the most generous awards go to students who pursue careers in high-need areas, such as education or nursing. Many schools in the United States give future nurses full scholarships to enter the field, especially if the student intends to work in a high-need community.
 College-specific: College-specific scholarships are offered by individual colleges and universities to highly qualified applicants. These scholarships are given on the basis of academic and personal achievement. Some scholarships have a "bond" requirement. Recipients may be required to work for a particular employer for a specified period of time or to work in rural or remote areas; otherwise, they may be required to repay the value of the support they received from the scholarship. This is particularly the case with education and nursing scholarships for people prepared to work in rural and remote areas. The programs offered by the uniformed services of the United States (Army, Navy, Marine Corps, Air Force, Coast Guard, National Oceanic and Atmospheric Administration Commissioned Officer Corps, and Public Health Service Commissioned Corps) sometimes resemble such scholarships.
 Athletic: Awarded to students with exceptional skill in a sport. Often this is so that the student will be available to attend the school or college and play the sport on their team, although in some countries government funded sports scholarships are available, allowing scholarship holders to train for international representation. School-based athletics scholarships can be controversial, as some believe that awarding scholarship money for athletic rather than academic or intellectual purposes is not in the institution's best interest.
 Brand: These scholarships are sponsored by a corporation that is trying to gain attention to their brand, or a cause. Sometimes these scholarships are referred to as branded scholarships. The Miss America beauty pageant is a famous example of a brand scholarship. 
 Creative contest: These scholarships are awarded to students based on a creative submission. Contest scholarships are also called mini project-based scholarships, where students can submit entries based on unique and innovative ideas.
"Last dollar": can be provided by private and government-based institutions, and are intended to cover the remaining fees charged to a student after the various grants are taken into account. To prohibit institutions from taking last dollar scholarships into account, and thereby removing other sources of funding, these scholarships are not offered until after financial aid has been offered in the form of a letter. Furthermore, last dollar scholarships may require families to have filed taxes for the most recent year, received their other sources of financial aid, and not yet received loans.

Notable scholarships

Name of scholarship with institution and/or sponsoring organisation
 Chevening Scholarship: Foreign & Commonwealth Office (UK)
 China Scholarship Council Scholarship: Government of China
 Commonwealth Scholarship: Commonwealth governments
 Coca-Cola Scholarship: the Coca-Cola Company
 Endeavour Awards: Government of Australia
 Erasmus Mundus: European Union
 Fulbright Scholarship
 Gates Cambridge Scholarship: Bill & Melinda Gates Foundation; University of Cambridge
 Jardine Scholarship: Jardine Matheson; Universities of Oxford and Cambridge
 Marshall Scholarship: UK universities
 Mitchell Scholarship: US-Ireland Alliance
 Morehead-Cain Scholarship: University of North Carolina
 Foundation Scholarship: Trinity College Dublin
 Rhodes Scholarship: University of Oxford
 Schwarzman Scholars: Tsinghua University

See also
 Bursary
 Free education
 Exhibition
 Fellowship (financial)
 Right to education
 Scholarships in Korea
 Scholarships in the United States
 Scholarships in Taiwan
 School voucher

References

Further reading
 DiFiore, Laura, et al. "Tips on Finding Scholarships." FreSch! Free Scholarship Search. 2013.
 Martin, Michel. "Scholarships: Who Gets Them and Why?" Tell me More 17

Academia
Education finance
+